Namayanja Rose Nsereko (born 18 August 1975) is a Ugandan lawyer, columnist, author, security sector manager and politician. She is the current National Treasurer of Uganda's ruling party, The National Resistance Movement (NRM).

Namayanja is the former Minister of Information and National Guidance in the Cabinet of Uganda, a position she held from 23 May 2013, until 1 March 2015. Prior to that, she served as Minister of State for Luwero Triangle in the Prime Minister's office, from 27 May 2011 until 24 May 2013. She replaced Thembo Nyombi, who was appointed State Minister for Information Technology. Namayanja also served as the elected Member of Parliament for Nakaseke District Women Representative from 2006 to 2016. She was a founder member of the Uganda Young Democrats (UYD), the youth wing of Uganda's Democratic Party (DP) that was known for its radicalism in the mid-1990s.

Background and education
Namayanja was born in Kalagi, a village in Nakaseke District (one of the Luwero Triangle districts) on 18 August 1975 to Jackson Ssebowa and Catherine Namirembe Ssebowa. A Muganda by tribe, she was born in an Anglican family. She converted to the Seventh-day Adventist Church while in high school. She attended Kabowa Church of Uganda Primary School, for her primary education and Light College Katikamu for her middle and high school education. She holds the degrees of Bachelor of Arts (1998) and Bachelor of Laws (2011), both from Makerere University, the oldest and largest public university in Uganda. She also holds the degree of Master of Science (2010), in Security Sector Management, obtained from and Cranfield University, the Defence Academy of the United Kingdom.

Career
Prior to her senior political career, Namayanja worked as an academic registrar for Light Bureau of Accountancy in 1998. Between 1999 and 2001, she worked as a political officer at State House Kampala. She started her political career as a student and youth leader at Makerere University in 1995. She was a founder member of the Uganda Young Democrats (UYD), the youth wing of Uganda's Democratic Party (DP). According to her, she drew her inspiration from the then young people in politics like the late Nobel Mayombo and further from the powerful women in politics like the former vice president of Uganda, Specioza Naigaga Wandira Kazibwe, Winnie Byanyima, Janat Mukwaya and Cecilia Ogwal. The desire to make a contribution to rebuilding Luwero Triangle, her homeland and the theatre of Yoweri Museveni's liberation war made her aim for more influential political positions.

In 2001 at the age of 25, she was elected as Member of Parliament (MP) representing the youth for Uganda's Central Region, which includes Luwero Triangle, for a five-year term. In 2006, having crossed to the NRM after the introduction of Multi-Party Politics and the creation of Nakaseke District the previous year, Namayanja stood unopposed for the position of Woman MP for Nakaseke District and was reelected in 2011 for a five-year term. In 2011, she was appointed for her first ministerial position as Minister of State for Luwero Triangle in the Office of the Prime Minister (OPM). She held that portfolio until she was appointed Minister of information and National Guidance on 23 May 2013, a position she held until 1 May 2015, when she was dropped from the Cabinet in consideration of the fact that she had been appointed National Treasurer of the National Resistance Movement in January 2015. Namayanja did not contest the 2016 general election.

Personal life
Rose Namayanja is married to Charles Nsereko. They were married in a Seventh-day Adventist ceremony on 2 September 2002. She was the Chairperson of the Uganda Parliamentary Forum for Children. She retired from active elective politics in 2016.

See also

References

External links
Nakaseke Teachers Sleeping In Classrooms
 Ugandan Leader: Be Prepared To Listen
"Parliamentary Oversight of The Security Sector In Uganda: Addressing The Structural, Political And Bureaucratic Challenges - Paperback, 11 October 2012, by Rose Namayanja Nsereko (Author)
Journalists Oppose New Fees

}

Living people
1975 births
Government ministers of Uganda
Members of the Parliament of Uganda
National Resistance Movement politicians
Ugandan Seventh-day Adventists
Converts to Adventism
Ganda people
People from Nakaseke District
Makerere University alumni
Alumni of Cranfield University
Ugandan journalists
Ugandan women writers
Ugandan women journalists
21st-century Ugandan women politicians
21st-century Ugandan politicians
Women government ministers of Uganda
Women members of the Parliament of Uganda
Ugandan columnists
Ugandan women columnists